Pussycat, Pussycat, I Love You is a 1970 American comedy film directed by Rod Amateau. Intended as a sequel to the 1965 film What's New, Pussycat?, it stars Ian McShane, Anna Calder-Marshall, John Gavin and Severn Darden.

Plot
A neurotic American living in Rome consults with an equally neurotic psychiatrist about his various fears, and the disintegrating relationship with his wife.

Cast
 Ian McShane as Fred Dobbs
 Anna Calder-Marshall as Millie
 John Gavin as Charlie
 Severn Darden as Dr. Fahrquardt
 Joyce Van Patten as Anna
 Beba Lončar as Ornella
 Veronica Carlson as Liz
 Ian Trigger as Dr. Ponti
 Katia Christine as Angelica
 Gaby André as Flavia
 Marino Masé as Franco
 Daniël Sola as Fernando 
 Dari Lallou as Hesther
 Linda Morand as Moira
 Madeline Smith as Gwendolyn 
 Maurizio Lucidi as Director
 Leopoldo Trieste as Desk Clerk

Production
Filming began in Rome in mid 1969. It was shot at Cinecittà Studios and on location around the city.

Reception
The Los Angeles Times said the film falls down with "a thud".

See also
 List of American films of 1970

References

External links

1970 films
1970 comedy films
Films directed by Rod Amateau
American comedy films
United Artists films
Films scored by Lalo Schifrin
Films shot at Cinecittà Studios
Films set in Rome
Films shot in Rome
American sequel films
1970s English-language films
1970s American films